Sir P.T. Sarvajanik College of Science is a science graduation college in Surat, Gujarat, India. The college is affiliated to Veer Narmad south Gujrat University. The college offers under-graduate courses in chemistry, maths, physics, botany and zoology. It also provides post-graduate courses in chemistry, physics and botany and Phd Courses in chemistry, physics and zoology.

In order to provide students with a quality academic environment, the college has developed all the necessary infrastructural facilities. The key among them are hostel, library, laboratory, playground, canteen, gymnasium, medical help, education loan, auditorium, scholarship.

History of college

As a result of the bifurcation of the M.T.B. College, the Sarvajanik College of Science came into existence formally in June 1960. However, its beginning can be traced to a period as early as 1927, when for the first time after the establishment of the Arts College in 1918; the Sarvajanik Education Society (SES) took steps to provide facilities for the teaching of the science courses in its college. In that same year, when Shri D. R. Gadgil was the Principal of the college, the University of Bombay granted permission for the teaching course in group A and B, and accordingly an intermediate science class was opened. In 1930, under the inspiring leadership of the Principal, Shri N. M. Shah, the society thought of developing a Science Institute which could provide instruction leading to the B.Sc. degree in chemistry, physics, mathematics and biology. But the difficulties, which were lying in their way, were not easy to surmount. The University of Bombay was thinking of bifurcating the Arts and Science Courses from the very first year of collegiate education. The financial position of the society was not strong enough to permit the construction of a spacious building for a Science Institute. However, the construction of the science building started in 1934. The ground floor of the new building became ready by June 1935. The University of Bombay thereupon, granted the affiliation to the M.T.B. College, for the teaching of the Intermediate Science Course of group B (chemistry, physics and biology) and the B.Sc courses (Principal and Subordinate) in physics, chemistry and mathematics and for B.A. honours and pass in physics and chemistry.
The opening ceremony of the huge and imposing building of the Science Institute was performed by the Governor of Bombay, His Excellency, the Right Honorable LordeBrabourne, on 19 December 1935. The first floor of the new Science building became ready in April 1936. The Chemistry Department was shifted to the new building from June 1936. In 1938 the University of Bombay granted permanent affiliation to the college for the teaching of science courses in physics, chemistry and mathematics up to intermediate level. On 12 December 1938, the Lady KikabhaiPremchand Library was made open to the students by Sir Roger Lumley, His Excellency, and the Governor of Bombay.

In 1943 botany was introduced as one of the subsidiary subjects at the B.Sc. level with a view to developing the biology section. However, its aim could not be realized until 1959 when a separate biology building was built for the purpose of expansion.

The Chemistry Department of the Institute made a record progress. In 1952 Prof. Dr. C. M. Desai was recognized as a guide for the Ph. D. students and under his able guidance, the Department made notable research work. Several students obtained their M.Sc., M.Phil. And Ph.D. degrees by doing research in organic, inorganic, physical and oil chemistry. The research work was highly praised by the foreign professors, the Government of India and Gujarat University and as a result of this; several financial grants were given to research students of the Science Institute. Dr. C. M. Desai was awarded the Fellowship of the Royal Institute of Chemistry, London and Dr. Miss H. J. Kazi was made an associate. On 5 July 1959, the biology building was made open by Shri Hitendra K. Desai, the Minister of Education, Bombay state. In June 1960 the Society bifurcated the M.T.B. College into two Colleges, one exclusively for Arts and other for Science. The Science Institute, which had come into existence in 1935, thus became a separate Science College in 1960, named as the Sarvajanik College of Science. Prof. M.S. Desai was appointed as the first Principal of the Science College.
The Science College, when it started its new journey as an independent college, was already a grown up institution with about one thousand undergraduate students. The courses offered were physics, chemistry and botany principal and subsidiary mathematics. Besides the college was recognized for post-graduate teaching of physics, chemistry and mathematics at M.Sc. level and chemistry at the Ph.D. level. (source-website of college)

See also
Sarvajanik College of Engineering and Technology
List of tourist attractions in Surat

References

https://www.ptscience.ac.in/
Jagaran Josh Article

External links
 Official website
 Sarvajanik Education Society

Universities and colleges in Gujarat
Science colleges in India
Science and technology in Gujarat